Israel Eliraz (Hebrew: ישראל אלירז; born Israel Rothstein on 23 March 1936 [Hebrew: ישראל רוטשטיין]; died on 22 March 2016) was an Israeli poet who won the Bialik Prize (2008), the Brenner Prize (2013), the ACUM lifetime achievement award (2003), the Nathan Alterman Award (2002), the Jerusalem Foundation-Jerusalem Municipality’s Belles-Lettres Award (1992 and 1999), the  Award (1963 and 1965), the  (2009), and the  (1994, 2008, and 2009).

Biography
Born Israel Rothstein on 23 March 1936 to a religious family in the Knesset Yisrael neighborhood of Jerusalem his parents were Ya’akov and Shifra Rothstein. He lived in Jerusalem all his life and was married to Naomi née Brunner with whom he had three children. Eliraz died on 22 March 2016 in Jerusalem, Jerusalem District. His resting place is in Kiryat Anavim, Mateh Yehuda Regional Council, Jerusalem District, Israel.

He wrote the libretto for Josef Tal's opera Ashmedai which premiered at the Hamburg State Opera in 1971, and was mounted at the New York City Opera in 1976.

Publications
אלירז, ישראל. דְּבָרִים דְּחוּפִים: מבחר שירים 1980–2010, עורך: ד״ר דרור בורשטיין, עם ״איך אלירז יכול לשנות את חייך,״ עמ׳ 380–390 מאת ד״ר דרור בורשטיין. תל אביב–יפו: הוצאת הקיבוץ המאוחד, ה׳תש״ע/2010, 392 עמ׳. 

Haaretz critic Prof. Dr.  wrote about this book that upon reading it he felt as if he “received endless letters from the poet regarding existential wonders" while Iton 77 critic  said that it changed his life.

אלירז, ישראל. הֵבִּט: שירה מביטה בציור – בעקבות ציוריו של יהושע (שוקי) בורקובסקי. תל אביב–יפו: קשב לשירה, ה׳תשע״ב/2012, 132 עמ׳. 

Haaretz critic Ouzi Zur praised this book's “wonderful poetic introspection regarding the quintessence of seeing.”

אלירז, ישראל. כַּמָּה זְמַן עוֹד נִשְׁאַר אֵינֶנָּה שְׁאֵלָה אֶלָּא דֶּלֶת. תל אביב–יפו ובן־שמן: הליקון ומודן הוצאה לאור, ה׳תשע״ג/2013, 96 עמ׳.

Further reading
פנחס־כהן, חוה. אסכולה של איש אחד: דיאלוג עם ישראל אלירז, סדרת קו אדום – אמנות, עורך: גיורא רוזן. תל אביב–יפו: הוצאת הקיבוץ המאוחד, ה׳תשע״א/2011, 237 עמ׳.

References

1936 births
2016 deaths
20th-century Israeli poets
20th-century Israeli male writers
21st-century Israeli poets
21st-century Israeli male writers
Brenner Prize recipients
Deaths from cancer in Israel
Hebrew University of Jerusalem alumni
Israeli schoolteachers
Israeli expatriates in Belgium
Israeli expatriates in France
Israeli expatriates in the United States
Israeli Ashkenazi Jews
Israeli male poets
Israeli people of Ashkenazi descent
Jewish Israeli writers
Jewish educators
Heads of schools in Israel
Secular Jews
Tel Aviv University alumni
University of Paris alumni
Virginia Commonwealth University faculty
Writers from Jerusalem
20th-century Israeli educators